The Globe Sessions is the third studio album by American singer-songwriter Sheryl Crow, released on September 21, 1998, in the United Kingdom and September 29, 1998, in the United States, then re-released in 1999. It was nominated for Album of the Year, Best Rock Album and Best Engineered Non-Classical Album at the 1999 Grammys, winning the latter two awards. The Globe Sessions reached  2 on the UK Albums Chart, while peaking at No. 5 on the Billboard 200 chart, achieving US sales of two million as of January 2008. The album was recorded at and named for the sessions recorded at Globe Recording Studio in New York owned by Robert FitzSimons and Tracey Loggia.

In 2019 it was announced that the 2008 fire that swept through Universal Studios Hollywood ultimately destroyed buildings belonging to Universal Music Group. It has since emerged that The Globe Sessions was one of hundreds of albums to have had their studio masters completely destroyed, making any future remasters or reissues doubtful. Many unreleased tracks and alternate takes on songs have also been lost.

Track listing

On earlier versions of the album the track "Crash and Burn" contains the hidden track "Subway Ride", running 11:19, while omitting "Sweet Child o' Mine". Another version eliminates both "Subway Ride" and "Sweet Child o' Mine". The version of "Sweet Child o' Mine" included is the 'Rick Rubin New Mix', originally featured on the Big Daddy soundtrack and later included on Hits & Rarities, and also called the 'Pop Version' on the CD single. It differs from the 'Rock Version' used in the single music video. The European version features "Resuscitation" (Crow, Trott) as the twelfth track; the Japanese version contains the bonus tracks "Carolina" and "Resuscitation" (Crow, Trott). The Australian tour edition of the album (released in 1999) contains "Resuscitation", "Sweet Child o' Mine", and a bonus CD containing six songs recorded live at the Church of the Holy Trinity in Toronto, Canada on November 13, 1998:

Personnel
Sheryl Crow – vocals, acoustic and electric guitar, acoustic and electric 12 string guitar, National steel guitar, bass guitar, keyboards, Hammond B-3 organ, Wurlitzer electric piano, clavinet, harmonica, percussion
Jeff Trott – acoustic and electric guitar (2, 3, 5–7, 10), tremolo guitar (1), 12 string guitar (4, 9), bass guitar (5), slide guitar (8), Moog synthesizer (10)
Gregg Williams – drums (1, 2, 4–6, 10, 11), percussion (2, 5, 6, 10), tambourine (3), programming
Benmont Tench – organ (3, 8), piano (7–9), chamberlin (9)
Mitchell Froom – clavinet and Orchestron (6)
Lisa Germano – violin (solo on 3, 4), autoharp (4)
Val McCallum – electric guitar (2, 10, 11)
Wendy Melvoin – guitar (1), bass guitar (4)
Todd Wolfe – electric guitar solo (4)
Tim Smith – bass (2)
Dan Rothchild – double bass (3), bass guitar (7–9)
Dan McCarroll – drums (2, 7–9)
Jim Bogios – drums (4)
Trina Shoemaker – drum loop (3)
Bobby Keys – alto, tenor and baritone saxophone (2)
Kent Smith – trumpet (2)
Michael Davis – trombone (2)
Avril Brown, Mark Feldman, Maura Giannini (−6), Matthew Pierce, Lorenza Ponce, Mary Rowell, Laura Seaton – violin (3, 6)
Michelle Kinney, Mary Wooten, Garo Yellin – cello (6)
Jimmie Haskell – string arrangement and conductor (6) 
Kathy Crow – vocals (8)
David Russo: - programming

Production
Producers: Sheryl Crow, ("Sweet Child o´Mine" produced by Rick Rubin)
Executive Producer: Rory Kaplan
Engineers: Trina Shoemaker
Additional recordings: S. Husky Höskulds
Assistant engineers: Brant Scott, Howard Willing, Ryan Baesch
Mixing: Tchad Blake, Andy Wallace (tracks 2, 7–9)
Assistant mixing engineers: S. Husky Höskulds, Steve Sisco, Howard Willing
Mastering: Bob Ludwig
Digital engineer: Jeff Levison
Surround mix and digital mastering: David Tickle
Production coordination: Brant Scott
Art direction and design: Jeri Heiden
Cover photography: Peter Lindbergh
Photographies inside: Tchad Blake

Accolades

Grammy Awards

|-
|  style="width:35px; text-align:center;" rowspan="5"|1999 ||rowspan="2"| The Globe Sessions || Album of the Year || 
|-
|Best Rock Album || 
|-
|"My Favorite Mistake" || Best Female Pop Vocal Performance || 
|-
|Sheryl Crow || Producer of the Year, Non-Classical || 
|-
| Andy Wallace, Tchad Blake & Trina Shoemaker (engineers) ||  Best Engineered Album, Non Classical || 
|-

Charts and certifications

Weekly charts

Year-end charts

Certifications

Release history

Notes

References

Globe Sessions Track Listing

1998 albums
Albums produced by Rick Rubin
Sheryl Crow albums
A&M Records albums
Grammy Award for Best Rock Album
Grammy Award for Best Engineered Album, Non-Classical